The 2016 Yas Marina GP3 Series round was a GP3 Series motor race held on 26 and 27 November 2016 at the Yas Marina Circuit in the United Arab Emirates. It was the final showdown of the 2016 GP3 Series. The race weekend supported the 2016 Abu Dhabi Grand Prix.

Classification

Qualifying

Race 1

Race 2

Standings after the round

Drivers' Championship standings

Teams' Championship standings

 Note: Only the top five positions are included for both sets of standings.

See also 
 2016 Abu Dhabi Grand Prix
 2016 Yas Marina GP2 Series round

References

External links 
 Official website of GP3 Series

|- style="text-align:center"
|width="35%"|Previous race:
|width="30%"|GP3 Series2016 season
|width="40%"|Next race:

GP3
Yas Marina
Yas Marina